was founded by late Honorary Chairman, Mr. Shotaro Uchiyama in February 1948 for the purpose of research and development, manufacturing, sales, installation and maintenance of elevators, escalators and travellators.

Fujitec Singapore Corp. was established in 1988, specializing in the manufacture, installation and service of lifts/elevators, escalators and moving walkways/travellators.

The company has operational headquarters located in the Americas, Japan, South Asia, East Asia and Europe and a network of 11 manufacturing facilities and several sales service offices.

Fujitec has an elevator factory in Hikone, and an escalator factory in Toyooka, Hyogo Prefecture, the USA (Cincinnati, Ohio), Singapore, Indonesia, China (suburbs of Beijing), Taiwan, Hong Kong and South Korea, and an escalator factory in Shanghai China.

In Japan, Fujitec's “Big Wing” facility houses a 560-foot research tower, one of the tallest in the world. This facility is focused on developing new technologies and integrating all phases of product development, design and manufacturing. Fujitec's research and development facility in China is located in the Song Jiang Industrial Zone in Shanghai and is approximately 150,000 m2 (1.6 million sq. ft). This space is utilized for parts and components procurement. Fujitec America continues to utilize the landmark, blue-capped 220-foot elevator research/test tower located near its U.S. headquarters in Mason, Ohio.

See also

 List of elevator test towers
 Fujitec-mae Station (Ohmi Railway Main Line)
 List of elevator manufacturers

References

External links

 Fujitec  
 Fujitec Global 

1970s initial public offerings
Companies based in Shiga Prefecture
Companies listed on the Tokyo Stock Exchange
Elevator manufacturers
Escalator manufacturers
Japanese brands
Japanese companies established in 1948
Manufacturing companies established in 1948
Manufacturing companies of Japan